State Route 327 (SR 327), also known as Blair Road, is a  north–south state highway in Roane County, Tennessee. It serves as a connector between the towns of Oliver Springs and Harriman with the western end of the city of Oak Ridge.

Route description

SR 327 begins in Oak Ridge at an intersection with SR 58. It goes north to pass by the historic George Jones Memorial Baptist Church and K-25 before crossing over Southern Appalachia Railway Museum's excursion railroad, to which it runs parallel to (and crosses several times) for the rest of its length, before crossing over Poplar Creek. The highway then passes by a substation before leaving Oak Ridge and paralleling Poplar Creek. SR 327 then crosses a couple of ridges and valleys, where it leaves Poplar Creek and has intersections with Poplar Creek Road, Old Harriman Highway, and Dyllis Road. The highway then passes through some mountainous terrain before crossing a Norfolk Southern railroad and coming to an end at an intersection with SR 61 in the community of Blair. The entire route of SR 327 is a two-lane highway.

Major intersections

References

327
Transportation in Roane County, Tennessee
Oak Ridge, Tennessee